M'Changama is a surname. Notable people with the surname include:

Mohamed M'Changama (born 1987), Comorian footballer
Youssouf M'Changama (born 1990), Comorian footballer